
Hux Flux was the Swedish solo musician Dennis Tapper (November 18, 1974 - May 15, 2018). His style is an unusual blend of psychedelic trance and goa trance. Hux Flux was formed in 1998 when Tapper started making music after being influenced by the forest parties outside Örebro in Sweden. After a few releases on his own, including the hit "Time Slices", Tapper started to work with Jonas Petterson and they produced the album Cryptic Crunch together on the label Koyote Records. Later, Tapper moved to Stockholm where he started to work with his old friend Henric Fietz. Their work resulted in tracks such as "Idiot" and "Bring your own BIOS". Tapper also produced tracks such as "Reflux" and "Equivalent Equations" on his own under the name Hux Flux and has also worked on the ambient project Illuminus with Magnus Holte.

On May 15, 2018, Dennis Tapper died in a tragic accident due to drowning near his house.

Discography

Albums 
Cryptic Crunch (Koyote Records 1999)
Division by Zero (Spiral Trax 2003)
Cryptic Crunch (Avatar Records / ProFile, remastered 2006)
Circle Sine Sound (Z-Plane Records 2015)

EPs 
Lex Rex Perplex/ErrorHead (2000)
Reflux/Java Junkies (1999)
Motor (2000)
Time Slices/Perceptor (1998)

References

External links 
 Hux Flux Myspace

Swedish musical groups
Swedish psychedelic trance musicians